Moszna may refer to two villages in Poland:

Moszna, Lublin Voivodeship (east Poland)
Moszna, Opole Voivodeship (south-west Poland; famous for its castle)